Forrestfield railway station served the settlement of Forrestfield, North Lanarkshire, Scotland from 1862 to 1930 on the Bathgate and Coatbridge Railway.

History 
The station opened on 11 August 1862 by the Monkland Railways. To the south was a loading bank siding and to the east was the signal box which opened in 1904, replacing the original box from 1895. It was also known as Forestfield in Bradshaw from 1864 to 1873. The station closed on 22 September 1930.

References

External links 

Disused railway stations in North Lanarkshire
Railway stations in Great Britain opened in 1862
Railway stations in Great Britain closed in 1930
1862 establishments in Scotland
1930 disestablishments in Scotland
Former North British Railway stations